Often an Orphan is a 1949 cartoon in the Merrie Melodies series. The cartoon was released on August 13, 1949 and stars Charlie Dog and Porky Pig.

The cartoon deals with Charlie trying to get Porky to adopt him after his old owner dumps him at Porky's farm on a trip disguised as a picnic. Charlie instead irritates Porky and the short deals with him trying to get rid of the dog in various ways, but failing each time.

Plot
The cartoon opens with a car driving up near a farm for a picnic and a man coming out and the dog Charlie coming out shortly after him. The man throws a stick, and when Charlie is off getting it, the man packs up and leaves in his car, deliberately leaving the dog behind. After Charlie is dumped, he tries various tricks to attract new owners from the people driving along the road. After three failures in various ways, he hears Porky singing and decides to go talk to him. He annoys Porky though as he says he is 50% various dogs but is mostly a Labrador Retriever ("Fifty percent Pointer—dere it is!  Dere it is!  Dere it is! Fifty Percent Boxer! Fifty percent Setter, Irish Setter! Fifty Percent watch dog! Fifty percent Spitz! Fifty percent Doberman Pinscher! But, mostly, I'm all Labrador Retriever!"). When reminded by Porky that he is not a Labrador retriever, he responds, "Look, if you doubt my woid, get me a Labrador, and I'll retrieve it for you. Dat's fair, isn't it?". After asking Porky if he has or knows where to get a Laborador retriever, he replies, "Then shut up!" He eventually drives Porky crazy and is kicked off his property. A series of gags then ensues with Charlie trying to become Porky's dog, with them all failing until Porky is about to kick Charlie out but is stopped by a nearby Humane Society worker, who is spying on Porky, who does not want to get in trouble with the law. Porky then sings "Rock-a-bye Baby" as he carries Charlie back and puts Charlie down. After the Humane Society worker leaves, a livid Porky demands that Charlie leave, but Charlie sadly and dramatically pleads Porky not to kick him out, as he always wanted to live in the country, and not the city, while Porky finally feels sorry for Charlie's traumatic experience in the city ("And now...  Now... Now that I got a chance to regain my health, you wanna send me back to the city. The city! I can see it all now. Its high towers! Cold, cruel, ominous! Closing down on ya! From every side till ya can't breathe! Closer! Closer! Ya can't breathe...! The traffic! Ya can't think! BEEP BEEP! BEEP BEEP! LOOK OUT FOR THAT TRUCK! HONK HONK! LOOK OUT FOR THAT TAXI! BOINNNG! BREEP-BREEP! AROOOOGAH! HONK HONK! BEEP BEEP! Ah...! Hark. What's that? Look! It's the towers! THEY'RE FALLING!").

Porky then seemingly accepts Charlie as a pet, but it's revealed to be a trick, as he puts the dog in a "sleeping bag" (which is actually a golf bag) which he promptly shuts and, cackling evilly, sends Charlie off to Scotland in it. However, when Porky returns, Charlie is there in Scottish attire complete with a bagpipe and he eventually drives Porky into accepting him as a pet with the bagpipe's annoying music.

Porky promptly suggests a picnic afterwards and he decides to head to the middle of a desert to do it, planning to abandon Charlie there. As Porky unpacks the food and calls Charlie out to catch the stick he has, Charlie comes running out.  Porky proceeds to throw the stick, but Charlie, not falling for the same trick again that his previous master pulled on him, runs to the car instead of going after the stick and drives off, deliberately leaving Porky behind.  Porky at first becomes furious, then suddenly snaps, gets a crazy look in his eyes and starts barking and panting, acting like a dog. He is picked up by the county dog catcher, who puts him in the back with the other dogs, where he barks along with them as the cartoon irises out.

References

External links

 

1949 films
1949 animated films
1949 short films
Merrie Melodies short films
Warner Bros. Cartoons animated short films
Short films directed by Chuck Jones
Porky Pig films
Films scored by Carl Stalling
Animated films about dogs
1940s Warner Bros. animated short films
Films with screenplays by Michael Maltese
Films set on farms
1940s English-language films
Charlie Dog films